George Thomas Leonard Ansell (28 November 1909 – 7 October 1988) was a footballer who played professionally as a forward for Brighton and Hove Albion and Norwich City.

After retiring from football Ansell became a teacher and was a Master at Kimbolton School, where he taught Latin.

Sources

1909 births
1988 deaths
English footballers
Norwich City F.C. players
Brighton & Hove Albion F.C. players
Association football forwards